Ingo Borkowski (born 2 October 1971) is a German sailor. He won a silver medal in the Soling class with Jochen Schümann and Gunnar Bahr at the 2000 Summer Olympics.

References

External links
 
 
 

1971 births
Living people
German male sailors (sport)
Olympic sailors of Germany
Olympic silver medalists for Germany
Olympic medalists in sailing
Sailors at the 2000 Summer Olympics – Soling
Sailors at the 2008 Summer Olympics – Star
Medalists at the 2000 Summer Olympics
H-boat class sailors
European Champions Soling
Sportspeople from Potsdam